Maffeis is a surname. Notable people with the surname include:

Agnese Maffeis (born 1965), Italian discus thrower and shot putter
Angela Maffeis (born 1996), Italian cyclist
Ivan Maffeis (born 1963), Italian Catholic bishop elect of Perugia

See also
Maffei

Surnames of Italian origin